Madeleine Wildi (born  in Olten) is a Swiss wheelchair curler.

She participated in the 2006 Winter Paralympics where Swiss team finished on sixth place.

Teams

References

External links 

Living people
1946 births
People from Olten
Swiss female curlers
Swiss wheelchair curlers
Paralympic wheelchair curlers of Switzerland
Wheelchair curlers at the 2006 Winter Paralympics
Swiss wheelchair curling champions
Sportspeople from the canton of Solothurn